Geometry of numbers is the part of number theory which uses geometry for the study of algebraic numbers.

The geometry of numbers has a close relationship with other fields of mathematics, especially functional analysis and Diophantine approximation, the problem of finding rational numbers  that  approximate an irrational quantity.

Minkowski's results

Minkowski's theorem on successive minima, sometimes called Minkowski's second theorem, is a strengthening of his first theorem and states that

Later research in the geometry of numbers
In 1930-1960 research on the geometry of numbers was conducted by many number theorists (including Louis Mordell, Harold Davenport and Carl Ludwig Siegel). In recent years, Lenstra, Brion, and Barvinok have developed combinatorial theories that enumerate the lattice points in some convex bodies.

Subspace theorem of W. M. Schmidt

In the geometry of numbers, the subspace theorem was obtained by Wolfgang M. Schmidt in 1972. It states that if n is a positive integer, and L1,...,Ln are linearly independent linear forms in n variables with algebraic coefficients and if ε>0 is any given real number, then
the non-zero integer points x in n coordinates with

lie in a finite number of proper subspaces of Qn.

Influence on functional analysis

Minkowski's geometry of numbers had a profound influence on functional analysis. Minkowski proved that symmetric convex bodies induce norms in finite-dimensional vector spaces. Minkowski's theorem was generalized to topological vector spaces by Kolmogorov, whose theorem states that the symmetric convex sets that are closed and bounded generate the topology of a Banach space.

Researchers continue to study generalizations to star-shaped sets and other non-convex sets.

References

Bibliography
 Matthias Beck, Sinai Robins. Computing the continuous discretely: Integer-point enumeration in polyhedra, Undergraduate Texts in Mathematics, Springer, 2007.

 J. W. S. Cassels. An Introduction to the Geometry of Numbers. Springer Classics in Mathematics, Springer-Verlag 1997 (reprint of 1959 and 1971 Springer-Verlag editions).
 John Horton Conway and N. J. A. Sloane, Sphere Packings, Lattices and Groups, Springer-Verlag, NY, 3rd ed., 1998.
R. J. Gardner, Geometric tomography, Cambridge University Press, New York, 1995. Second edition: 2006.
P. M. Gruber, Convex and discrete geometry, Springer-Verlag, New York, 2007.
P. M. Gruber, J. M. Wills (editors), Handbook of convex geometry. Vol. A. B, North-Holland, Amsterdam, 1993.
M. Grötschel, Lovász, L., A. Schrijver: Geometric Algorithms and Combinatorial Optimization, Springer, 1988
 (Republished in 1964 by Dover.)
 Edmund Hlawka, Johannes Schoißengeier, Rudolf Taschner. Geometric and Analytic Number Theory. Universitext. Springer-Verlag, 1991.
 
 C. G. Lekkerkererker. Geometry of Numbers. Wolters-Noordhoff, North Holland, Wiley. 1969.
 
Lovász, L.: An Algorithmic Theory of Numbers, Graphs, and Convexity, CBMS-NSF Regional Conference Series in Applied Mathematics 50, SIAM, Philadelphia, Pennsylvania, 1986

 Wolfgang M. Schmidt. Diophantine approximation. Lecture Notes in Mathematics 785. Springer. (1980 [1996 with minor corrections])
 

 Rolf Schneider, Convex bodies: the Brunn-Minkowski theory, Cambridge University Press, Cambridge, 1993.
 Anthony C. Thompson, Minkowski geometry, Cambridge University Press, Cambridge, 1996.
 Hermann Weyl. Theory of reduction for arithmetical equivalence . Trans. Amer. Math. Soc. 48 (1940) 126–164. 
 Hermann Weyl. Theory of reduction for arithmetical equivalence. II . Trans. Amer. Math. Soc. 51 (1942) 203–231.